Adolfo Rodríguez Saá was Governor of the San Luis Province in Argentina. His grandson Adolfo Rodríguez Saá, would serve as President of Argentina. He was also grandfather and brother of San Luis Province Governors Alberto Rodríguez Saá and Ricardo Rodríguez Saá.

References

Governors of San Luis Province
Argentine people of Palestinian descent